Ahmad Faraj (born 6 March 1966) is an Emirati swimmer. He competed at the 1988 Summer Olympics and the 1992 Summer Olympics.

References

1966 births
Living people
Emirati male swimmers
Olympic swimmers of the United Arab Emirates
Swimmers at the 1988 Summer Olympics
Swimmers at the 1992 Summer Olympics
Place of birth missing (living people)
Swimmers at the 1994 Asian Games
Asian Games competitors for the United Arab Emirates